Donough O’Brien (born 23 April 1939) is a British marketing and public relations executive and author of books containing quirky facts.

Life
O'Brien was born in London, the son of E.D. (Toby) O’Brien. His father helped to run Britain's propaganda against the Nazis in World War II, was then the Conservative Party’s first professional Public Relations officer and later PR consultant. The O’Brien family is one of the oldest lines of descent in Europe, dating back from much earlier than the Irish High King Brian Boru (941-1014).

O'Brien was educated at Stowe School and then at university in Paris and Munich. He served in the Irish Guards for four years as a National Service and then as a Short Service Officer. During the 1960s he lived in London sharing a flat with Hon. Brian Alexander (son of Harold Alexander, 1st Earl Alexander of Tunis) and Patrick Lichfield Earl of Lichfield, known as a society photographer. At this time O'Brien combined his interest in painting and motor-racing to become a motor racing artist working for Shell, BP, Porsche and Mercedes Benz.

Public relations
After a start in the Rank Organisation, O'Brien developed a broad-based marketing career in public relations, advertising, design and film-making. In 1987, his design company, Sampson Tyrrell was bought by WPP Group, now the largest marketing group in the world. He also founded, with Chris Spring, the New York-based Spring O’Brien Inc., a tourism and information technology marketing firm.

Writing
O'Brien also went into authoring, his first illustrated book published in 2000 being Fringe Benefits, which charted the lives of both Donough and his father Toby, with a foreword by Joanna Lumley He followed this by Fame by Chance in 2003 which identified places all over the world which had been made famous, or infamous, by a twist of fate. Peter Ackroyd, historian and author, in his foreword commented "I do not remember reading an anthology of places that became famous quite by chance. This book contains many such stories of fortuitous association, fascinating and surprising in equal measure. An unusual and compendious addition to the literature of famous topographies." Banana Skins, the slips and screw-ups that brought the famous down to earth was published in 2006 and Numeroids, any number of things you didn’t know … and some you did in 2008.

O'Brien's uncle Turlough O’Brien was a publicist for the Home Office and then the Post Office.

References

1939 births
Living people
People educated at Stowe School
Irish Guards officers
British writers
British advertising executives